Chang Chen Ghost Stories is a 2016 Chinese romance horror thriller film directed by Zhan Yue. It was released in China on July 8, 2016.

Plot

Cast
Lu Shan
Fu Heng
Wu Jinxi
Song Hanhuan
Ding Qi
Wei Yun
Li Yu

Reception
The film has grossed  in China.

References 

2016 horror thriller films
Chinese horror thriller films
2016 horror films
2010s romantic thriller films
Chinese supernatural horror films
2010s Mandarin-language films